Alfred Brandon may refer to:

 Alfred Brandon (politician) (1809–1886), New Zealand politician
 Alfred Brandon (mayor) (1854–1938), his son, mayor of Wellington, New Zealand, 1893–1894
 Alfred Brandon (lawyer) (1883–1974), his son, New Zealand lawyer and military aviator